The Robert C. Weaver Federal Building is a 10-story office building in Washington, D.C., owned by the federal government of the United States. Completed in 1968, it serves as the headquarters of the United States Department of Housing and Urban Development (HUD). Built by the General Services Administration, it is a prime example of Brutalist architecture. The structure is named for Dr. Robert C. Weaver, the first Secretary of Housing and Urban Development and the first African American Cabinet member.

The building was added to the National Register of Historic Places on August 26, 2008.

Building conception
In 1962, President John F. Kennedy established the Ad Hoc Committee on Federal Office Space and charged it with developing new guidelines for the design of federal office buildings. On May 23, 1962, the Ad Hoc Committee issued a one-page report, Guiding Principles for Federal Architecture, which established these new design principles. The document encouraged federal planners to consider and build structures that "reflect the dignity, enterprise, vigor and stability of the American National Government" and "embody the finest contemporary American architectural thought."

In 1965, major revisions to federal housing policy resulted in the creation of the U.S. Department of Housing and Urban Development. The United States Congress passed and President Lyndon B. Johnson signed the Housing and Urban Development Act of 1965 on August 10, 1965, which President Johnson called "the single most important breakthrough" in federal housing policy since the 1920s. The legislation greatly expanded funding for existing federal housing programs, and added new programs to provide rent subsidies for the elderly and disabled; housing rehabilitation grants to poor homeowners; provisions for veterans to make very low down-payments to obtain mortgages; new authority for families qualifying for public housing to be placed in empty private housing (along with subsidies to landlords); and matching grants to localities for the construction of water and sewer facilities, construction of community centers in low-income areas, and urban beautification. Just four weeks later, on September 9, President Johnson signed legislation establishing the U.S. Department of Housing and Urban Development.

Design work on the future HUD building began immediately. Karel Yasko, Assistant Commissioner for Design and Construction in the U.S. General Services Administration (GSA), oversaw the design process in accordance with the Ad Hoc Committee's guidelines. In 1946, the Congress had passed the District of Columbia Redevelopment Act, which established the District of Columbia Redevelopment Land Agency and provided for clearance of land and redevelopment funds in the capital. After a decade of discussion, public comment, and negotiations with landowners and developers, the Southwest Urban Renewal Plan was approved in November 1956. In part, the plan cleared the way for GSA to build new large federal office buildings between Independence Avenue SW and Southeast Freeway to its south. The HUD building, the only office building south of the railroad tracks (which bifurcated the area on an east–west axis), was designed to be a showcase for the Ad Hoc Committee's design guidelines. Internationally known architect Marcel Breuer submitted the building's winning design. Breuer became the building's lead architect, assisted by his associate Herbert Beckhard and the firm of Nolen-Swinburne.

Breuer drew on many of his previous buildings for inspiration for HUD Headquarters. He had built curvilinear precast concrete buildings before for UNESCO's world headquarters in Paris and the IBM Research Center in La Gaude (both in France). The curvilinear shape allowed the maximum amount of natural light to reach the maximum number of offices. This design also reflected much of the architectural style adopted during the early 1960s in Washington, D.C., (notably at the Watergate complex). The final design resembles that of a giant capital letter "X" with an elongated spine and four bilateral, symmetrical, curving arms. The four arms created four spaces. The northern space was given over to gigantic HVAC vents. The western space was planted with grass and with low concrete benches lining the semicircular space.

GSA's design specifications required that extensive underground parking be incorporated into the building. Breuer designed a lightweight,  plaza to fit as a sort of roof over the underground parking garage. The plaza surface would be covered in masonry "stones", with a curving driveway (mimicking the building facade) to lead vehicular traffic into the garage entrance and exit (which were situated in the center of the plaza). An offshoot of the driveway (set off by bollards) came up to the front doors to allow the limousines of high-ranking visitors to pull up directly to the building's front doors. Because the weight of the plaza/roof had to be kept light, no plantings (lawns, trees, shrubs, etc.) were envisioned for the plaza. Although the plaza was devoid of plants, its shape and vast expanse were designed to relate aesthetically to the nearby National Mall.

Deep-set windows in rectilinear shapes, a Breuer trademark, were planned for the facade. The window frames were made of precast concrete. The building was the first Breuer-designed structure in the United States to use a precast concrete facade, and this was the first federal building to be built of precast concrete. The facade was designed to be load-bearing, with the panels on the second, third, and fourth floors designed to carry the weight of the building. The window frames on the eighth, ninth, and tenth floors were slightly thinner, because although they were not load-bearing they had to contain HVAC piping. The panels on the middle floors required the least amount of fabrication, according to architect Herbert Beckhard (an associate in Breuer's firm who helped design the building), as they did not need to bear as much load nor contain much piping. The windows do not meet at the corner of the concrete frame. Pipes from the I-395 tunnel (which runs below the building) run up through the building's walls and vent at the corners of the window frames, dispersing automobile exhaust fumes high in the air. The firm which supplied the window frames had no previous experience producing architectural concrete, but instead had supplied precast forms for bridges and parking garages.

The structure's interior floors were also made precast concrete. However, the floors were almost made of more than-traditional materials. Late in the design process, GSA accountants estimated that the cost of precast concrete for the flooring would be exceptionally high, and GSA threatened to change the architectural plans. But after extensive discussions between GSA and Breuer, GSA relented. The plans were let to bid as designed, and the floors were fabricated for significantly less than estimated.

The base of the building was designed to look much different from the upper nine floors. The building's first floor is recessed, with load-bearing concrete pilotis (piers) supporting the upper floors at intervals around the building. The V-shaped columns taper to a narrow base that creates a more open, "lighter" appearance at ground level and whose angularity contrasts with the building's curving facade. The walls of the recessed first floor are not bare concrete but rather sheathed in granite.

No abrasive blasting or acid etching of the visible exterior concrete was used to smooth the appearance of the structure, as Breuer and Beckhard believed concrete casting techniques had advanced sufficiently to no longer require it.

An Oscar Stonorov bust of Catherine Bauer Wurster, an influential public housing advocate in the 1930s, adorns the building's Main (South) lobby.

The project was expected to cost $32 million, although only $29 million was appropriated by Congress for construction.

Construction and naming
Title to the land under the future HUD building was held by the D.C. Redevelopment Land Agency, and site preparation began in November 1965. Groundbreaking and construction had already begun by the spring of 1966. John McShain, Inc., one of the largest federal building contractors in the Washington metro area, was named the lead construction contractor. A strike by the United Brotherhood of Carpenters and Joiners of America temporarily delayed construction in May 1966. The building's cornerstone was laid by Vice President Hubert H. Humphrey in November of that year. Unfortunately, during the HUD building's construction, the footings for the western portion of the building were accidentally built  over the property line. The -thick footings were  underground. When L'Enfant Properties, leaseholder of the property abutting the HUD site, began construction of L'Enfant Plaza Hotel in 1971, the company was forced to sue John McShain, Inc. and the Redevelopment Land Agency for removal of the footings, stabilization of the HUD structure, and associated costs. The action spawned several lengthy court battles which lasted through the 1970s.

The HUD headquarters building was formally dedicated on September 21, 1968. President Johnson and HUD Secretary Robert C. Weaver attended the ceremony. The final structure contained  of office space. There were 10 stories of offices above ground, and another two floors below ground. The final cost was just $26 million (about $162 million in 2010 dollars).

In 2000, the HUD building was officially renamed the Robert C. Weaver Federal Building in honor of Dr. Robert C. Weaver, the first HUD Secretary and the first African American Cabinet member.

Main plaza reconstruction
The plaza was roundly criticized by HUD employees. Not a single positive comment about the plaza was given by HUD workers in a 1979 survey, and employees strongly criticized the lack of seating in the space. The plaza as a whole, one urban planning group concluded, was bleak and unwelcoming. Signage, lighting, identification of entrances, and the regulation of pedestrian traffic in the plaza, the Project for Public Spaces told HUD (which had commissioned a study of the building), were so poor that they were characterized as a "disaster".

In the late 1980s, the plaza began leaking water into the building's underground parking garage. Rather than merely fix the leak, HUD Secretary Henry Cisneros encouraged GSA to renovate or reconstruct the plaza to make it more worker- and pedestrian-friendly. In 1990, Martha Schwartz, a nationally recognized Massachusetts-based landscape architect known for her unconventional and colorful designs, was commissioned to redesign the plaza. Schwartz initially envisioned low, round, concrete planters containing grass that would double as seating, and donut-shaped canopies of brightly colored plastic (lit from within at night) set upon 18-foot steel poles to provide shelter from the sun and rain. Schwartz developed her design in 1994 after receiving public feedback during a workshop sponsored by the National Endowment for the Arts. Although the design had passed through the GSA's rigorous planning and design process and had the support of J. Carter Brown (then-chairman of the United States Commission of Fine Arts, which had co-approval over the design) and HUD Secretary Cisneros (a trained urban planner), GSA Commissioner Robert A. Peck strongly disliked it. By the time Schwartz's design was ready for installation, Cisneros had left HUD and Andrew M. Cuomo was the new Secretary. Cuomo is alleged to have disliked the canopies and feared that the brightly colored plastic would draw public ridicule, and so pressed for alterations. In a compromise, the canopies were retained but colored a neutral white. Schwartz also designed a back-lit mural composed of images of HUD-financed building projects to be installed on the granite wall under the loggia, but this was canceled due to cost concerns.

Critical assessment
The Robert C. Weaver Federal Building is one of two buildings in Washington, D.C., designed by Marcel Breuer (the other is the Hubert H. Humphrey Building).

The Weaver Building is considered a prime example of Breuer's "soft" Brutalist aesthetic. Critics say it "set new civic standards for architectural design", and have called it a masterpiece of Modern architecture. At the structure's dedication, President Lyndon B. Johnson declared it "bold and beautiful," HUD Secretary Robert C. Weaver said it was "urban and urbane," and GSA Administrator Lawson B. Knott Jr., praised it as "a lasting architectural asset to our capital city and our country". The New York Times said the building "is a handsome, functional structure that adds quality design and genuine 20th century style to a city badly in need of both." In 1998, The Washington Post architectural critic called the building "impressive...a brooding, strangely graceful concrete honeycomb." Architecture critic Carole Rifkind called it "compelling by virtue of the swaggering efficiency of the construction system."

Yet, the building is not admired by many. The building had very little grass or garden space where employees could eat or relax during lunch, and very little of that planted space contained seating—which caused extensive employee resentment. The garden areas had such small trash containers that they overflowed every workday afternoon. The building's interior spaces were also strongly critiqued by the late 1970s. According to the Project for Public Spaces, which studied the building on HUD's behalf:
The lack of welcome extends into the building lobbies, where there is a need for information of nearly every kind. ...there are no public maps; outdoor directional signs are too few and too small; the Metro signposts are so discreet they are hard to find;...there is no indication of where visitors should enter; the entrances are hard to find;...the main reception desk is in the south lobby, though more people enter through the north; information boards are not where people look for them; house phones are not clearly labeled; cafeteria entrances and the HUD information center are hidden. Finally, the lobbies themselves are so dimly lit—especially in contrast to the glaring front plaza—that this, too, adds to the confusion.

In 2009, then Secretary of Housing and Urban Development Shaun Donovan noted that "the building itself is among the most reviled in all of Washington—and with good reason." Former Secretary of Housing and Urban Development Jack Kemp once described the building as "10 floors of basement." One historian of urban planning called the building an "out-of-towner's 'ego trip'". An architectural critic for The Washington Times wrote in 2007, "They are two of the ugliest buildings in town: the austere, concrete hulk of the U.S. Department of Housing and Urban Development on 7th Street Southwest and its counterpart, the U.S. Department of Health and Human Services on Independence Avenue Southwest. ... Mr. Breuer's sculptural style, named 'brutalism' for 'béton brut' (French for 'raw concrete'), has come to represent the worst aspects of modern architecture: stark, unfriendly buildings fronted by empty plazas." The Washington City Paper said the building "sits up on stilts that look like rhinoceros feet, aloof from everything around it." Many critics have argued that Breuer's design is unoriginal, and essentially mimics the UNESCO Headquarters and IBM Research Center which he designed several years earlier.

The Schwartz-designed plaza, too, has been criticized. "It looks as though a battalion of seven flying saucers has floated down to Earth in front of the Department of Housing and Urban Development," wrote the Washington City Paper. "[W]hat stands on HUD's plaza today is not so much the homage to shelter Schwartz originally intended as a token of capitulation." The canopies have been criticized for being too far from the round seating area/planters and not close enough to the street, thus rendering them useless as the shelter they were designed to be. The Project for Public Spaces rated the plaza the eighth-worst public plaza in the world in 2004. Others have praised the plaza's new design. The Washington Post said the canopies provide "a pleasant shock... Seven ghostly spaceships appear to be hovering comfortably above its front yard, keeping watch over an orderly gathering of white-rimmed, ground-hugging disks shouldering healthy mounds of grass."

See also
 Architecture of Washington, D.C.

Footnotes

Bibliography
"An Eyeful of Washington Eyesores." Washington Post. December 21, 2008.
Barron, James. "Robert C. Weaver, 89, First Black Cabinet Member, Dies." New York Times. July 19, 1997.
Beckhard, Herbert. "The Breuer-Beckhard Precast Facades." In Exterior Wall Systems: Glass and Concrete Technology, Design, and Construction. Barry Donaldson, ed. Philadelphia, Pa.: ASTM International, 1991. 
"Black History Month Salutes Black Leaders, Astronauts, Billionaires." Wilkes County News-Reporter. February 1, 2007.
"Bust of Late Catherine Bauer Wurster Placed in HUD Building." Journal of Housing. 1968.
Committee on the District of Columbia. Subcommittee on Fiscal and Government Affairs. Amend Redevelopment Act of 1945 and Transfer U.S. Real Property to RLA: Hearings and Markups Before the Subcommittee on Fiscal and Government Affairs and the Committee on the District of Columbia. U.S. House of Representatives. 95th Congress, Second Session. Washington, D.C.: U.S. Government Printing Office, 1978.
Connelly, Joel. "As Suburbs Reach Limit, People Are Moving Back to the Cities." Seattle Post-Intelligencer. February 4, 2010.
Conroy, Sarah Booth. "Marcel Breuer, Architect, Pioneer of Modern Furniture Design, Dies." Washington Post. July 3, 1981.
Corrigan, Richard. "Carpenters' Talks Break Off." Washington Post. May 3, 1966.
Davis, Barbara. Remaking Cities: Proceedings of the 1988 International Conference in Pittsburgh. Pittsburgh: Pittsburgh Chapter of the American Institute of Architects, 1989. 
Dietsch, Deborah K. "Benign Breuer: Exhibit Ignores Bauhaus Architect's Mistakes." Washington Times. November 3, 2007.
Donovan, Shaun. "Prepared Remarks for Secretary of Housing and Urban Development Shaun Donovan at the HUD Summer Intern Event." U.S. Department of Housing and Urban Development. June 24, 2009. Accessed 2010-03-06.
Forgey, Benjamin. "Flying Saucers At HUD." The Washington Post. June 6, 1998.
Goldberger, Paul. "Marcel Breuer, 79, Dies." New York Times. July 2, 1981.
Gournay, Isabelle. "Washington: The DC's History of Unresolved Planning Conflicts." In Planning Twentieth Century Capital Cities. David L.A. Gordon, ed. Florence, Ky.: Routledge, 2006. 
Grooms, Thomas. "The Charrette Process: A Tool for Achieving Design Excellence." In Federal Facilities Beyond the 1990s: Ensuring Quality in an Era of Limited Resources. Washington, D.C.: National Academies, 1997. 
Gutheim, Frederick Albert and Lee, Antoinette Josephine. Worthy of the Nation: Washington, D.C., From L'Enfant to the National Capital Planning Commission. 2d ed. Baltimore: Johns Hopkins University Press, 2006. 
Hagel, Jack. "Herbert H. Swinburne, 88, A Noted Philadelphia Architect." Philadelphia Inquirer. July 2, 2001.
Hodges, Allan A. and Hodges, Carol A. Washington on Foot: 23 Walking Tours of Washington, D.C., Old Town Alexandria, Virginia, and Historic Annapolis, Maryland. 2d ed. Washington, D.C.: Smithsonian Institution Press, 1980. 
"HUD Building Seen As Turning Point for Department and Public Architecture." Journal of Housing. 1968.
Huxtable, Aida Louise. "The House That HUD Built." New York Times. September 22, 1968.
Kennon, Donald R. and Striner, Richard. Washington Past and Present: A Guide to the Nation's Capital. 2d ed. Washington, D.C.: United States Capitol Historical Society, 1987. 
L'Enfant Plaza Properties, Inc. v. United States. 227 Ct. Cl. 1; 645 F.2d 886 (1981).
L'Enfant Plaza East, Inc. v. John McShain, Inc. 359 A.2d 5 (1976).
McKee, Bradford. "The Battle for Pep-O-Mint Plaza." Washington City Paper. May 22–28, 1998.
Moeller, Gerard Martin and Weeks, Christopher. AIA Guide to the Architecture of Washington, D.C. 4th ed. Baltimore: Johns Hopkins University Press, 2006. 
Muhammad, Alverda Ann. "HUD Building Renamed In Honor of Robert C. Weaver." Washington Informer. July 19, 2000.
Nelson, Michael, ed. Guide to the Presidency: The White House and the Executive Branch. 3d ed. Washington, D.C.: CQ Press, 2002. 
Phillips-Fein, Kim. "Living for the City: Robert Clifton Weaver's Liberalism." The Nation. January 12, 2009.
Porter, Lawrence. "Disillusioned in D.C.: I Was Dazzled By The Virtual HUD Plaza—Then I Saw the Real Thing." Landscape Architecture. July 2001.
Pritchett, Wendell E. Robert Clifton Weaver and the American City: The Life and Times of an Urban Reformer. Chicago: University of Chicago Press, 2008. 
Project for Public Spaces. The HUD Building, Washington, D.C.: A Public Space Improvement Plan. New York: Project for Public Spaces, 1979.
Rifkind, Carole. A Field Guide to Contemporary American Architecture. New York: Dutton Adult, 1998. 
"Robert C. Weaver Federal Building, Washington, DC: Building Overview." U.S. General Services Administration. August 4, 2009. Accessed 2010-03-07.
Saxon, Wolfgang. "Herbert Beckhard, 77, Architect Who Worked With Bauhaus Master." New York Times. October 27, 2003.
Scott, Pamela and Lee, Antoinette Josephine. Buildings of the District of Columbia. Reprint ed. New York: Oxford University Press, 1993. 
Schwartz, Martha; Meyer, Elizabeth K.; Landecker, Heidi; and Vance, Sarah. Martha Schwartz: Transfiguration of the Commonplace. Washington, D.C.: Spacemaker Press, 1997. 
Semple Jr., Robert B. "$7.5 Billion Bill, With a Rent Subsidy Proviso, Signed by Johnson." New York Times. August 11, 1965.
"Today in Washington." Washington Post. November 10, 1966.
Wasserman, Paul and Hausrath, Don. Washington, D.C. from A to Z: The Look-Up Source to Everything to See & Do in the Nation's Capital. Sterling, Va.: Capital Books, 2003. 
Williams, Paul K. Southwest Washington. Charleston, S.C.: Arcadia Publishing, 2006. 
"The World's Best and Worst Parks." Making Places. September 2004.

External links

General Services Administration page on the Robert C. Weaver Federal Building

Federal buildings in the United States
Marcel Breuer buildings
Brutalist architecture in Washington, D.C.
Buildings of the United States government in Washington, D.C.
Office buildings in Washington, D.C.
Government buildings completed in 1968
Southwest Federal Center